Stamåhjulet is a mountain in Skjåk Municipality in Innlandet county, Norway. The mountain is surrounded by several other notable mountains including Nørdre Svarthaugen to the southeast, Skarvedalseggen to the east, Blåhøe and Gråhø to the northeast, and Dørkampen and Høggøymen to the northwest.

See also
List of mountains of Norway

References

Skjåk
Mountains of Innlandet